Askepasma is an extinct genus of brachiopods which existed in what is now Australia and southern China during the Lower Cambrian.

The type species is A. toddense. A. transversalis occurs in Guizhou, and A. saproconcha is the oldest known southern Australian brachiopod from the lower Cambrian.

References

External links
 Askepasma at the Paleobiology Database

Prehistoric brachiopod genera